The 1970 Italian Grand Prix was a Formula One motor race held at the Autodromo Nazionale di Monza on September 6, 1970. It was race 10 of 13 in both the 1970 World Championship of Drivers and the 1970 International Cup for Formula One Manufacturers. The race was marred by the death of Jochen Rindt, who died during the practice session on September 5. Rindt himself went on to become Formula One's only posthumous World Champion to date. The 68-lap race was won by Ferrari driver Clay Regazzoni for his first Grand Prix victory after starting from third position. Jackie Stewart finished second for the Tyrrell team in one of the last races the team used the March chassis and Matra driver Jean-Pierre Beltoise came in third.

This was the last time that Monza was driven for 68 laps. From 1971 onwards, the race distance would be 55 laps. It was also the last win for a driver wearing an open-face helmet in Formula One. As of 2022, this was also the last time all three podium finishers used different tyre brands; Regazzoni used Firestones, Stewart used Dunlops and Beltoise used Goodyears.

Qualifying

Qualifying classification 

Jochen Rindt qualified 12th, but did not start the race after a fatal accident. His place in grid was left vacant.

Race

Classification 

 Lotus withdrew after death of Jochen Rindt. His place in grid was left vacants.

Championship standings after the race

Drivers' Championship standings

Constructors' Championship standings

Note: Only the top five positions are included for both sets of standings.

References

Italian Grand Prix
Italian Grand Prix
1970 in Italian motorsport
Italian Grand Prix